For other municipalities with the same name, see: Fiadanana (disambiguation)

Fiadanana is a rural municipality in Madagascar. It belongs to the district of Ambohidratrimo (district), which is a part of Analamanga Region. 
The population of the commune was 7,223 in 2019.

Rivers
The Sisaony is the only river that crosses the municipality.

Ethnics
The village is inhabited by the Merina.

Religion
71% of the population are Protestants, 25% are Catholic.

References

Populated places in Analamanga